Phantom Investigators is an American children's animated TV show that aired on Kids' WB in 2002, premiering on May 25 and ending on August 17 for 13 episodes. It was created using a special mixture of stop-motion (used for the main cast and the other citizens), puppetry (used for many of the supernatural creatures that are encountered), and live-action (used mainly for ghosts). The show was created by Stephen Holman, known for his work on Joe Normal for MTV's Liquid Television and Life with Loopy for Nickelodeon's KaBlam! which ran during all the duration.

Synopsis
The show revolved around four 13-year-olds who attend Lugosi Junior High School in San Francisco. The group is known as The Phantom Investigators, or "P.I.s" for short, who solve supernatural mysteries that occur all over town ranging from ghost hauntings to demonic encounters. While leading double lives as P.I.s, the group must also balances everyday issues such as homework, personal hobbies, and friendships.

Characters

PI 
Daemona Prune, the leader of the Phantom Investigators. She is the only member who hides their identity by donning a mask and trench coat. Though lacking in supernatural powers, she utilizes her knowledge of the paranormal along with an assortment of gadgets to identify paranormal entities and vanquish them; voiced by Courtney Vineys.
Jericho, the most laid back of the Phantom Investigators who loves physical activities such skateboard & martial arts and utilizes telekinetic abilities; voiced by Alecsander Kocev.
Casey, the most academically inclined member of the Phantom Investigators who has a love for sci-fi movies and can shapeshift into anything; voiced by Andrew Decker.
Kira Jones, the most empathic member of the Phantom Investigators who dreams of being a famous DJ with versatility in telepathy that allow her to communicate with others, probe minds, and influence people; voiced by Amber Ross.

Companions 
Wad, a gum-chewing sprite who was once a pixie named Todd but was demoted to a sprite as a punishment for his mischief; voiced by Stephen Holman.
Jinxy, an bad luck demon who reluctantly at times helps the Phantom Investigators by offering information about the Nether Realm and its entities; voiced by Stephen Holman.

Others 
Professor Felix Navarro, mentor to the Phantom Investigators, he supplies the P.I.s gadgets and vehicles from time to time to help with their investigations; voiced by Richard Cansino
Mr. & Mrs. Prune, Daemona's parents who are unaware of Daemona's double life as a Phantom Investigator; voiced by Dave Mallow and Jessica Gee respectively.
Mustafa, a former janitor of Lugosi Junior High turned ghost that resides in the school and offers information about the school and the paranormal to the P.I.s; portrayed by Stephen Chirazzi.
Mary Prune, Daemona's Grandmother, a member of The Mystery & Horror Book Club at Lugosi Junior High back in the 50's but in reality was a Phantom Investigator with telepathic abilities.
Hal Prune, Daemona's Grandfather, a member of The Mystery & Horror Book Club at Lugosi Junior High back in the 50's but in reality was a Phantom Investigator with teleportation abilities.

Episodes
Phantom Investigators only ran for 6 weeks before Kids’ WB pulled it from their schedule and replaced it with X-Men: Evolution. Holman would say in a 2019 podcast interview that its cancellation came in spite of it being the top-rated program in its time slot because it failed to catch on with the demographic the network wanted. Kids’ WB was looking to attract and maintain a strong viewership with young boys. Phantom Inspectors was attracting more and more girls and losing the boys each successive week. After the cancellation, Sony cut the funding to the show killing any chance of finding a new network to take it on. The remaining episodes eventually aired outside of the United States, first debuting on Teletoon in Canada.

Birthday Presence (airdate: May 25, 2002) - The most popular kid in school suddenly finds himself being haunted as he plans his annual birthday bash.
The Year of the Snake (airdate: June 1, 2002) – Tamagotchi like virtual pets become the fad around town but seem to have a hold over whoever plays with them.
Stall of Doom (airdate: June 8, 2002) – One of the bathroom stalls at Lugosi Junior High contains a gateway to the Nether Realm that is sucks in students.
Were-Dog (airdate: June 15, 2002) – While disguised as a dog, Casey gets bitten by a werewolf and ends up unable to change back.
Demon Driver (airdate: June 22, 2002) – The team investigates an old car that was built with possessed parts and turns its driver into a reckless maniac.
Omega Pizza Pi (airdate: June 29, 2002)– Pizza deliverers are being terrorized by the ghosts of a 1960s fraternity under the control of a pizza-based demon.
Thank Wad – Wad is given 24 hours to prove he’s worthy of restoration to his former status by dealing with a serious situation seriously, otherwise he’ll remain a chewing gum sprite forever.
Ghosts on Film – The ghost of an actor from an old black and white movie believes they are a space tyrant and exits through a VCR looking to conquer the real world.
Skating the Plank – A local skateboarder makes themself a skateboard from remains of pirate ship and is then haunted by the ship's captain. 
From Egypt with Love – A mummy contacts the Phantom Investigators to help him to cross over into the afterlife.
Haunted Dreams – As Kira considers quitting the team, a girl comes to them suffering from haunted dreams.
The 5th P.I. – A new kid at school leads the P.I.s to think they found a new member, but he ends up being a Nether Realm cop intent on arresting them.
Secrets Exposed! – Someone from Navarro’s past returns and leads to some revelations about him and his connection to the Phantom Investigators.

References

External links
 
 

2000s American animated television series
2002 American television series debuts
2002 American television series endings
American children's animated fantasy television series
American children's animated horror television series
American children's animated mystery television series
American children's animated supernatural television series
American stop-motion animated television series
American television series with live action and animation
American television shows featuring puppetry
Animated television series about children
Animated television series about ghosts
Kids' WB original shows
Television series by Adelaide Productions
Television series by Sony Pictures Television
Television series about demons
Television shows set in San Francisco